Shinella zoogloeoides is a bacterium of the genus Shinella.

References

Hyphomicrobiales
Bacteria described in 2006